Kathrine Kristine Beck  (born 1950), known mainly by her pen name of K. K. Beck,  is an American novelist.  She has written over a dozen books, some of which were part of the Iris Cooper novel series and the Jane da Silva novel series.  Her novels were published between 1984 and 1999.

An early novel of hers, Death of a Prom Queen (1984) was written under the pen name of Marie Oliver. 
She wrote a series of other novels, under the name K. K. Beck, such as The Revenge of Kali-Ra in 1999.  One of her most recent works, The Tell-Tale Tattoo and Other Stories (2002), is a collection of short stories.

She appeared on the quiz show Jeopardy! on September 3, 1991 (under the name Katherine Marris), finishing in third place in her game.

She lives in Seattle, Washington, and was married to the crime-writer Michael Dibdin, who died in 2007.

References

External links
List of her novels
 Publishers Weekly Books by K. K. Beck and Complete Book Reviews

1950 births
Living people
American women novelists
20th-century American novelists
American women short story writers
20th-century American women writers
20th-century American short story writers
21st-century American women